Justin Boocock (born 24 April 1975 in Launceston) is an Australian slalom canoeist who competed at the international level from 1990 to 2004. He finished 16th in the C1 event at the 1996 Summer Olympics in Atlanta.

World Cup individual podiums

References

1975 births
Australian male canoeists
Canoeists at the 1996 Summer Olympics
Living people
Olympic canoeists of Australia